1194 Aletta, provisional designation , is a carbonaceous asteroid from the outer region of the asteroid belt, approximately 55 kilometers in diameter. It was discovered on 13 May 1931, by South African astronomer Cyril Jackson at Johannesburg Observatory in South Africa. It was later named after the discoverer's wife Aletta Jackson.

Classification and orbit 

Aletta is a dark C-type asteroid and orbits the Sun at a distance of 2.6–3.2 AU once every 4 years and 12 months (1,816 days). Its orbit has an eccentricity of 0.09 and an inclination of 11° with respect to the ecliptic. The body's observation arc begins at Johannesburg, one week after its official discovery observation. No precoveries were taken and no prior identifications were made.

Physical characteristics

Diameter and albedo 

According to the surveys carried out by the Infrared Astronomical Satellite IRAS, the Japanese Akari satellite, and NASA's Wide-field Infrared Survey Explorer with its subsequent NEOWISE mission, Aletta measures between 41.358 and 55.39 kilometers in diameter, and its surface has an albedo between 0.03 and 0.87. The Collaborative Asteroid Lightcurve Link derives an albedo of 0.0333 and a diameter of 55.23 kilometers based on an absolute magnitude of 10.6.

Rotation period 

In November 2007, American astronomer James W. Brinsfield obtained the first ever lightcurve of Aletta with period of 19.7 hours and a brightness variation of 0.32 magnitude at Via Capote Observatory. Two more lightcurves were obtained by Australian astronomer Julian Oey at Leura/Kingsgrove Observatory in March 2010, and by the Survey conducted at the Palomar Transient Factory, California, in October 2012. Lightcurve analysis gave a concurring rotation period of 20.39 and 20.3903 hours with an amplitude of 0.28 and 0.27 magnitude, respectively.

Naming 

The discoverer named this minor planet for his wife, Aletta Jackson (née Maria Aletta Lessing). Naming citation was first mentioned in The Names of the Minor Planets by Paul Herget in 1955.

References

External links 
 Asteroid Lightcurve Database (LCDB), query form (info )
 Dictionary of Minor Planet Names, Google books
 Asteroids and comets rotation curves, CdR – Observatoire de Genève, Raoul Behrend
 Discovery Circumstances: Numbered Minor Planets (1)-(5000) – Minor Planet Center
 
 

001194
Discoveries by Cyril Jackson (astronomer)
Named minor planets
19310513